Roberts County Courthouse in Sisseton, South Dakota was built in 1902.  It was listed on the National Register of Historic Places in 1976.

It is notable for reflecting the contention between competing towns for the county seat.

References

Renaissance Revival architecture in South Dakota
Government buildings completed in 1902
Buildings and structures in Roberts County, South Dakota
County courthouses in South Dakota
Courthouses on the National Register of Historic Places in South Dakota
National Register of Historic Places in Roberts County, South Dakota